Peter Joseph Baltes (April 7, 1827 – February 15, 1886) was a German-born American prelate of the Roman Catholic Church. He served as bishop of the Diocese of Alton in Illinois from 1870 until his death in 1886.

Biography

Early life 
Peter Bates was born on April 7, 1827, in Ensheim, Rhenish Palatinate in the Kingdom of Bavaria (today a part of Germany). He was the fourth child of the carpenter and tinsmith Andreas Baltes and his wife Susanna née Walljan. In 1833, the family emigrated to the United States, settling in Oswego, New York. 

After attending the College of the Holy Cross in Worcester, Massachusetts, to study classics, Baltes entered Saint Mary of the Lake Seminary in Chicago, Illinois.  He completed his studies for the priesthood at the Grand Seminary of Montreal in Montreal, Quebec.

Priesthood 
Baltes was ordained to the priesthood in Montreal for what was then the Diocese of Chicago on May 21, 1853.  After his ordination, Baltes returned to Chicago, where he received a pastoral assignment to a parish in Waterloo, Illinois. 

In 1855, Baltes was incardinated, or transferred, to the Diocese of Quincy, with a pastoral assignment at a parish in Belleville, Illinois. While in Belleville, he placed both the local parochial school and the Young Ladies' Academy of the Immaculate Conception under the care of the School Sisters of Notre Dame,  He also constructed  St. Peter's Church in Belleville. In a reorganization in 1857, Belleville became part of the new Diocese of Alton and Baltes was incardinated there.

In 1866, Bishop Henry Juncker named Baltes as vicar general of the Diocese of Alton.  He attended the Second Plenary Council of Baltimore that year with Juncker. Following Juncker's death in October 1868, Baltes became apostolic administrator of the diocese. In 1868 or 1869, he persuaded the Illinois General Assembly to pass a law allowing Catholic congregations and institutions to incorporate.

Bishop of Alton 
On September 24, 1869, Baltes was named the second bishop of the Diocese of Alton by Pope Pius IX. He received his episcopal consecration on January 23, 1870, from Bishop John Luers, assisted by Bishops Augustus Toebbe and Patrick Ryan as co-consecrators, at St. Peter's in Belleville, Illinois. As bishop, Baltes quickly instituted a constitution that outline practices with all the parishes.

In 1870, Baltes issued a pastoral letter criticizing the Freeman Journal, a Pittsburgh Catholic newspaper that supported the rights of priests.  He said that by allegedly supporting discord between priest and their bishops, the Journal editors and readers were opening themselves up to divine punishment.  Baltes issued another pastoral letter in 1879 that banned Catholics in his diocese from reading newspapers or journals that criticized the Catholic Church.  The ban on the Freeman Journal was rescinded a few years later.

Baltes held annual spiritual retreats with his clergy.  Contemporary accounts described him as an enthusiastic teacher, a tough disciplinarian and a strong defended of church doctrine.  He banned contemporary music from church services, replacing it with the Gregorian chant and Cecilian music. By the end of his tenure, the diocese included 109,000 Catholics, 177 priests, 126 parishes and 77 missions, 13 hospitals, three orphanages, two homes for the elderly, two men's colleges, a boys' high school, nine girls' academies, and 102 parochial schools with 11,000 students.

In 1878, Baltes went to Germany to visit Ensheim.  While there, he celebrated a mass in the Speyer Cathedral in Speyer, Germany.  In January 1884, 27 nuns died in a fire at the Convent of the Sisters of Notre Dame in Belleville.  Baltes attended the funeral mass there, but was too sick to celebrate it. Long suffering from diseases of the kidneys, bladder, and liver, Baltes was also unable to attend the Third Plenary Council of Baltimore in 1884.

Death 
In the summer of 1885, Baltes traveled to a resort on the Atlantic coast at the recommendation of his doctor.  However, he soon became incapacitated and spent two months in hospitals in New York City and Montreal.  In September 1885, Baltes was well enough to return to Alton, but then suffered a relapse.  He recovered again, but on February 12, 1886, became very ill.  

Peter Baltes died from liver disease on February 15, 1886, in Alton at age 58.

References

External links
Homepage Ensheim Saarland, with picture
House of Bavarian History, with picture (German)

1827 births
1886 deaths
People from Saarbrücken
Bavarian emigrants to the United States
People from the Palatinate (region)
19th-century Roman Catholic bishops in the United States
Roman Catholic bishops of Alton